Milan Kný is a retired Czechoslovak slalom canoeist who competed from the late 1950s to the mid-1960s. He won a silver medal in the C-2 team event at the 1959 ICF Canoe Slalom World Championships in Geneva.

References

External links 
 Milan KNY at CanoeSlalom.net

Czechoslovak male canoeists
Possibly living people
Year of birth missing (living people)
Medalists at the ICF Canoe Slalom World Championships